John Sidney Battle (born November 9, 1962) is a retired American professional basketball player and pastor. A 6' 2" (1.88 m) guard from Rutgers University, Battle was selected in the fourth round of the 1985 NBA Draft by the Atlanta Hawks. He ended his career with 5,338 points. Battle had three nicknames: "J.B.," "Cricket," and "Pickle." Battle is married to R&B singer/recording artist Regina Belle.

NBA career statistics

Regular season 

|-
| style="text-align:left;"| 
| style="text-align:left;"|Atlanta
| 64 || 0 || 10.0 || .455 || .000 || .728 || 1.0 || 1.2 || 0.4 || 0.0 || 4.3
|-
| style="text-align:left;"| 
| style="text-align:left;"|Atlanta
| 64 || 8 || 12.6 || .457 || .000 || .738 || 0.9 || 1.9 || 0.5 || 0.1 || 6.0
|-
| style="text-align:left;"| 
| style="text-align:left;"|Atlanta
| 67 || 1 || 18.3 || .454 || .390 || .750 || 1.7 || 2.4 || 0.5 || 0.1 || 10.6
|-
| style="text-align:left;"| 
| style="text-align:left;"|Atlanta
| 82 || 0 || 20.4 || .457 || .324 || .815 || 1.7 || 2.4 || 0.5 || 0.1 || 9.5
|-
| style="text-align:left;"| 
| style="text-align:left;"|Atlanta
| 60 || 48 || 24.6 || .506 || .154 || .756 || 1.7 || 2.6 || 0.5 || 0.1 || 10.9
|-
| style="text-align:left;"| 
| style="text-align:left;"|Atlanta
| 79 || 2 || 23.6 || .461 || .286 || .854 || 2.0 || 2.7 || 0.6 || 0.1 || 13.6
|-
| style="text-align:left;"| 
| style="text-align:left;"|Cleveland
| 76 || 2 || 21.5 || .480 || .118 || .848 || 1.5 || 2.1 || 0.5 || 0.1 || 10.3
|-
| style="text-align:left;"| 
| style="text-align:left;"|Cleveland
| 41 || 0 || 12.1 || .415 || .167 || .778 || 0.7 || 1.3 || 0.2 || 0.1 || 5.4
|-
| style="text-align:left;"| 
| style="text-align:left;"|Cleveland
| 51 || 1 || 16.0 || .476 || .263 || .753 || 0.8 || 1.6 || 0.4 || 0.0 || 6.6
|-
| style="text-align:left;"| 
| style="text-align:left;"|Cleveland
| 28 || 0 || 10.0 || .377 || .355 || .731 || 0.4 || 1.3 || 0.3 || 0.0 || 4.1
|- class="sortbottom"
| style="text-align:center;" colspan="2"| Career
| 612 || 62 || 17.8 || .464 || .273 || .793 || 1.3 || 2.1 || 0.4 || 0.1 || 8.7

Playoffs 

|-
|style="text-align:left;"|1986
|style="text-align:left;”|Atlanta
|6||0||4.5||.364||.000||.750||0.7||0.3||0.3||0.0||1.8
|-
|style="text-align:left;"|1987
|style="text-align:left;”|Atlanta
|8||0||9.8||.441||.400||.913||1.3||1.0||0.1||0.0||6.6
|-
|style="text-align:left;"|1988
|style="text-align:left;”|Atlanta
|12||0||13.8||.478||.000||.680||1.7||2.2||0.2||0.0||6.8
|-
|style="text-align:left;"|1989
|style="text-align:left;”|Atlanta
|5||0||23.6||.435||.000||.750||2.6||3.2||0.4||0.0||9.8
|-
|style="text-align:left;"|1991
|style="text-align:left;”|Atlanta
|5||0||21.4||.364||.400||.960||2.0||2.2||0.2||0.0||11.6
|-
|style="text-align:left;"|1992
|style="text-align:left;”|Cleveland
|15||0||13.5||.415||.000||.913||0.8||1.0||0.3||0.1||5.9
|-
|style="text-align:left;"|1993
|style="text-align:left;”|Cleveland
|1||0||6.0||.000||–||–||1.0||1.0||0.0||0.0||0.0
|-
|style="text-align:left;"|1994
|style="text-align:left;”|Cleveland
|1||0||8.0||1.000||–||–||2.0||0.0||0.0||0.0||2.0
|-
|style="text-align:left;"|1995
|style="text-align:left;”|Cleveland
|2||0||3.5||.667||.000||–||0.0||0.5||0.0||0.0||2.0
|- class="sortbottom"
| style="text-align:center;" colspan="2"| Career
| 55 || 0 || 13.1 || .429 || .182 || .848 || 1.3 || 1.5 || 0.2 || 0.0 || 6.3

Personal life
In 1991, Battle married singer Regina Belle.

References

External links

1962 births
Living people
American men's basketball players
Atlanta Hawks draft picks
Atlanta Hawks players
Basketball players from Washington, D.C.
Cleveland Cavaliers players
Point guards
Rutgers Scarlet Knights men's basketball players